Theodore Ringwalt Hartley (born November 6, 1924) is a U.S. Navy fighter pilot, investment banker, actor, film  producer, and is currently CEO of RKO Pictures. He was married to heiress, actress and philanthropist Dina Merrill until her death in 2017. His last acting credit was 2012 and his last producing credit was in 2015.

Early life

Hartley was born in Omaha, Nebraska and raised on a farm in Iowa. His father died when he was 5, causing financial hardships for the family. At the age of 14, he entered a contest sponsored by Warner Bros., wrote a 50-word essay on “Why I like to fly”, and won some flying lessons. 

Hartley attended Shattuck Military School in Minnesota, and by the age of 16 he had won an appointment to the U.S. Naval Academy. After flight training, among other tours, he served as a carrier-based fighter pilot, flying F-11s following their introduction in 1956.

Career
As a Navy officer, Hartley had tours as a congressional liaison for the Pentagon, as a Presidential aide, as well as a carrier-based fighter pilot. In May 1964, his F9F8 fighter crashed during a carrier landing accident. He was thrown from the jet, suffered a broken back, and was medically retired from the Navy. After Hartley's military career prematurely ended, he attended Harvard Business School and pursued a career in investment banking, becoming Vice President for First Western Financial Corporation.

His next career was in Hollywood, as an actor, where he took on the role of Reverend Jerry Bedford on the 1960s television series Peyton Place. Hartley had featured roles in films with Cary Grant, Robert Redford and Clint Eastwood, and then in the late 1970s was cast in his own series, ABC's Chopper One, about helicopter flying police officers. The series was short lived, and thereafter Hartley moved to Aspen, Colorado, where he volunteered as the Managing Artistic Director of the local theater, and then turned to commodity trading full-time.

In 1987, he became involved with Pavilion Communications Inc., a company designed to acquire smaller entertainment companies. Through this, Hartley learned of an opportunity to take over RKO Pictures. He and wife Dina Merrill purchased 51% of the company and merged Pavilion Communications with RKO Pictures Corporation in 1991, forming RKO Pictures, LLC. Their first major project was the 1998 remake of Mighty Joe Young. As chairman and chief executive officer of RKO Pictures, Hartley has led RKO's worldwide development and production activities in movies and television as well as the expansion of the RKO brand to stage and other entertainment and distribution venues. He produced a remake of Mighty Joe Young (1998) with Disney, Ritual (2000) with Miramax, a remake of The Magnificent Ambersons (2002), and Shade (2003). For RKO Stage, he produced the musicals Never Gonna Dance (2003), Curtains (2007), Gypsy (2008), 13 (2008), all on Broadway, and Top Hat (2012) in the West End, winner of the 2013 Laurence Olivier Award for Best New Musical.
 
In 2013, he was elected chairman of the board of Orbis International, a nonprofit eye-healthcare organization dedicated to saving sight worldwide that he has been involved with since 2010. 

Hartley belongs to a number of motion picture and television guilds and associations, is a board member of the Steadman Philippon Research Institute (formerly, Steadman-Hawkins Sports Medicine Foundation), and serves as director of the Harvard Business School Association of Southern California. He and Merrill founded the Story Project to promote literacy among inner-city youth, beginning in the Santa Monica Boys and Girls Club. Hartley is a frequent lecturer and is published periodically in business journals. He is also a published poet as well as a creator of stories for the screen.

Producer credits

Film
Barely Lethal (producer)
A Late Quartet (producer)
Beyond a Reasonable Doubt (producer)
Are We Done Yet? (producer)
Laura Smiles (producer)
Shade (producer)
The Gin Game (executive producer)
The Magnificent Ambersons (executive producer) 
Ritual (producer)
Mighty Joe Young (producer)
Milk & Money (producer)
False Identity (executive producer)
Women And Men: Stories Of Seduction (executive producer)

Stage Productions
 Never Gonna Dance - 2003 Broadway musical
 Curtains - 2007 Broadway musical 
 Gypsy - 2008 Broadway musical (revival starring Patti Lupone)
 13 - 2008 Broadway musical 
 Top Hat - 2012 West End Musical

Actor credits

Film
Walk, Don't Run (1966) - Yuri Andreyovitch
Murderers' Row (1966) - Guard
Barefoot in the Park (1967) - Frank
Ice Station Zebra (1968) - Lt. Jonathan Hansen
The Man (1972) - Press Secretary
High Plains Drifter (1973) - Lewis Belding
Aloha, Bobby and Rose (1975) - Cop
Moving Violation (1976) - Prosecutor
Matilda (1978) - Payne Smith
Caddyshack II (1988) - Club Member
False Identity (1990) - Inn Keeper
The Player (1992) - Party Guest (uncredited)
Milk & Money (1996) - Lingerie Salesman
Shade (2003) - 'Teddy' The Surgeon
Laura Smiles (2005) - Therapist
Race to Witch Mountain (2009) - Four-Star General V. Lewton
A Late Quartet (2012) - Winning Bidder

References

External links
 Personal website
 
 
 "Ted Hartley...and the Rebirth of RKO Studios"
 "Flight of Fancy: Ted Hartley, who came to Hollywood as an actor and left for investing, has found running the legendary RKO studio rife with challenges", July 8, 2002, Los Angeles Business Journal
 People magazine, April 19, 1999 (pdf)
 U.S. Naval Academy Alumni Association newsletter, "Ted Hartley '46" (PDF)

1934 births
Living people
American male film actors
American male television actors
American film producers
American chief executives
Age controversies
Harvard Business School alumni
United States Naval Aviators